Pedro Mendes (born 1 November 1987) is a Swiss model and male beauty pageant titleholder who was named Mister International 2015 at the finals held at the Newport Performing Arts Theater at Resorts World Manila in Pasay, Metro Manila, the Philippines. He is the first Swiss to win the title of Mister International in the history of the pageant, and the second European man who won the title after Ryan Terry, Mister Great Britain 2010.

Personal life
Pedro lives in Geneva, Switzerland and works as a model. He is known as Mister Switzerland 2015 or (in French) Mister Suisse Francophone 2015. He becomes brand ambassador of his country with Catarina Lopes, the reigning Miss Suisse Francophone, who also competed at the Miss Supranational 2015 in Poland and is his girlfriend.

Mister International 2015
On 30 November 2015 Pedro named Mister International 2015 represented Switzerland. He was crowned by the former Mister International 2014 of the Philippines, Neil Perez at Newport Performing Art Theater Resorts World Manila. He overcame the other thirty six delegates from across the world to be the next Mister International. Beside he wins the title, Brazil, Korea, Panama and the Czech Republic were declared as the runners-up by the judges of Mister International.

Reign as Mister International 2015
After his crowning, during December 2015 Pedro was interviewed by Mornings @ ANC, CNN Philippines, ABS-CBN's "Sports Unlimited", and GMA News TV.

On 13 December 2015 Pedro returned to Switzerland to celebrate his victory and join Conférence Mister Switzerland 2016 at Casino Barrière Montreux.

April 15, 2016 Pedro traveled the Cairo, Egypt to be part of the judge in the final Miss Eco Universe 2016.

During his reign, Pedro have traveled around the globe. Some of the places are Singapore, Philippines, Egypt, United Kingdom, Italy, Canada, Portugal, Malta.

References

External links
 http://www.misterinternational.net/
 http://misssuissefrancophone.ch

1987 births
Living people
Swiss male models
Swiss people of Portuguese descent
Mister International
Models from Geneva
Male beauty pageant winners
Swiss beauty pageant winners